Fercert Ó hUiginn (died 1419) was an  Irish poet.

Fercert was a member of the Ó hUiginn brehon family of Connacht. His obit, sub anno 1419 in the Annals of the Four Masters, identifies him as the head of Ó hUiginn line descended from the poet Gilla na Neamh Ó h-Uiginn, who died in 1349:

 Ferceart, the son of Higgin, son of Gilla-na-naev O'Higgin, the Kennfinè of the race of Gilla-na-naev O'Higgin, died.

External links
 http://www.ucc.ie/celt/published/T100005D/

Medieval Irish poets
People from County Sligo
People from County Mayo
People from County Galway
15th-century Irish poets
1419 deaths
Year of birth unknown
Irish male poets